German submarine U-925 was a Type VIIC U-boat of Nazi Germany's Kriegsmarine during World War II.

She was ordered on 25 August 1941, and was laid down on 15 June 1942 at Neptun Werft AG, Rostock, as yard number 512. She was launched on 6 November 1943 and commissioned under the command of Oberleutnant zur See Hellmut Knoke on 30 December 1943.

Design
German Type VIIC submarines were preceded by the shorter Type VIIB submarines. U-925 had a displacement of  when at the surface and  while submerged. She had two shafts and two  propellers.

U-925 was fitted with five  torpedo tubes (four fitted at the bow and one at the stern), fourteen torpedoes or 26 TMA mines, one  SK C/35 naval gun, (220 rounds), one  Flak M42 and two twin  C/30 anti-aircraft guns. The boat had a complement of between 44 — 52 men.

Service history
On 24 August 1944, U-925 left Kristiansand on her first war patrol, sailing through the Iceland passage en route to the North Atlantic for weather reporting duty. Nothing was ever heard again from U-925 and she was posted missing on 18 September 1944, all hands, 51 crewmen, lost.

References

Bibliography

External links

 Roll of Remembrance

German Type VIIC submarines
U-boats commissioned in 1943
World War II submarines of Germany
Ships built in Rostock
1943 ships
Maritime incidents in August 1944
World War II shipwrecks in the North Sea
Missing U-boats of World War II